Nova 106.9 (call sign: 4BNE) is a commercial radio station operating in Brisbane, 
Queensland, Australia, owned by NOVA Entertainment. DMG Radio purchased the Brisbane FM licence for $80 million in April 2004 to complete their national network of Nova stations. Nova 106.9's studios are located at 130 Commercial Road in Teneriffe.

History
Following the successful bid for the last commercial FM licence to be auctioned for Brisbane in April 2004, on the frequency originally occupied by Ipswich station Q-FM which later changed its name to Star FM, Nova 106.9 – call sign 4BNE – began test transmissions in August 2004. These transmissions featured comedy pieces with a 'personality' by the name of "Bevan - The Work Experience DJ" who is widely rumoured to be comedian Simon Kennedy. Bevan still is a feature in Nova 106.9's programming often hosting infrequent shows at Christmas time and special events. The test broadcasts continued up until the official launch on 4 April 2005 from a temporary studio in a converted Teneriffe woolstore, while the new studio complex was being completed upstairs in the same building. The new studio complex became operational in February 2006.

Nova 106.9 took over rival B105's sponsorship of the Brisbane Broncos in late 2006, and Nova's logo replaced B105's on the Broncos training gear.  In 2007 it became the official FM station for the Rugby League State of Origin series, and a media partner of Brisbane Roar, the Brisbane Lions, the Queensland Bulls and the 2008 Summer Olympics.

In December 2017, Nova announced that it will network Greg Burns from Nova 96.9 as opposed to local announcers. Katie Mattin will move to the afternoon shift with Tim Wong-See leaving the station. In June 2018, local announcers returned to the station with Katie Mattin replacing Greg Burns.

Studios

The Nova 106.9 Studios are located in a converted woolstore in Teneriffe. The interior of the building retains as much of the original construction as possible with the open office construction with no ceilings.

The Studio block consists of 5 broadcast and production studios as well as a newsroom. The master control room is located outside as a showpiece overlooking the foyer and a bridge across an atrium for natural light to access the floors below.

The complex is based around the Klotz Digital Vadis audio system linking all the studios and Master Control to the transmission site at Mt Coot-tha. The Studios use the Maestro Digital Audio playout system as used by all the Nova stations.

References

External links 
 Nova 106.9 Website
 NOVA Entertainment

Radio stations in Brisbane
Nova Entertainment
Contemporary hit radio stations in Australia
Radio stations established in 2005
Nova (radio network)
Radio stations on the Gold Coast, Queensland